Traditional Chinese opera, or Xiqu, is a form of musical theatre in China with roots going back to the early periods in China. It is an amalgamation of various art forms that existed in ancient China, and evolved gradually over more than a thousand years, reaching its mature form in the 13th century, during the Song dynasty (960–1279). Early forms of Chinese theater are simple, but over time various art forms such as music, song and dance, martial arts, acrobatics, costume and make-up art, as well as literary art forms were incorporated to form traditional Chinese opera. Performers had to practice for many years to gain an understanding of the roles. Exaggerated features and colors made it easier for the audience to identify the roles portrayed.

There are over a hundred regional branches of traditional Chinese opera today. In the 20th century the Peking opera emerged in popularity and has come to known as the "national theatre" of China, but other genres like Yue opera, Cantonese opera, Yu opera, kunqu, qinqiang, Huangmei opera, pingju, and Sichuan opera are also performed regularly before dedicated fans. Their differences are mainly found in the music and topolect; the stories are often shared and borrowed. With few exceptions (such as revolutionary operas and to some extent Shanghai operas) the vast majority of Chinese operas (including Taiwanese operas) are set in China before the 17th century, whether they are traditional or newly written.

For centuries Chinese opera was the main form of entertainment for both urban and rural residents in China as well as the Chinese diaspora. Its popularity declined sharply in the second half of the 20th century as a result of both political and market factors. Language policies discouraging topolects in Taiwan and Singapore, official hostility against rural religious festivals in China, and de-Sinicization in Taiwan have all been blamed for the decline of various forms in different times, but overall the two major culprits were Cultural Revolution — which saw traditional culture systematically erased, innumerable theatre professionals viciously persecuted, and younger generation raised with far lesser exposure to Chinese opera – and modernization, with its immense social impact and imported values that Chinese opera has largely failed to counter. The total number of regional genres was determined to be more than 350 in 1957, but in the 21st century the Chinese government could only identify 162 forms for its intangible cultural heritage list, with many of them in immediate danger of disappearing. For young people, Chinese opera is no longer part of the everyday popular music culture, but it remains an attraction for many older people who find in it, among other things, a national or regional identity.

History

Six dynasties to Tang
An early form of Chinese drama is the Canjun Opera (參軍戲, or Adjutant Play) which originated from the Later Zhao Dynasty (319–351). In its early form, it was a simple comic drama involving only two performers, where a corrupt officer, Canjun or the adjutant, was ridiculed by a jester named Grey Hawk (蒼鶻). The characters in Canjun Opera are thought to be the forerunners of the fixed role categories of later Chinese opera, particularly of its comic chou (丑) characters.

Various song and dance dramas developed during the Six Dynasties period.  During the Northern Qi Dynasty, a masked dance called the Big Face (大面, which can mean "mask", alternatively daimian 代面, and it was also called The King of Lanling, 蘭陵王), was created in honour of Gao Changgong who went into battle wearing a mask. Another was called Botou (撥頭, also 缽頭), a masked dance drama from the Western Regions that tells the story of a grieving son who sought a tiger that killed his father. In The Dancing Singing Woman (踏謡娘), which relates the story of a wife battered by her drunken husband, the song and dance drama was initially performed by a man dressed as a woman. The stories told of in these song-and-dance dramas are simple, but they are thought to be the earliest pieces of musical theatre in China, and the precursors to the more sophisticated later forms of Chinese opera.

These forms of early drama were popular in the Tang dynasty where they further developed.  For example, by the end of the Tang Dynasty the Canjun Opera had evolved into a performance with more complex plot and dramatic twists, and it involved at least four performers. The early form of Chinese theatre became more organized in the Tang dynasty with Emperor Xuanzong (712–755), who founded the "Pear Garden" (梨园/梨園; líyuán), the first academy of music to train musicians, dancers and actors. The performers formed what may be considered the first known opera troupe in China, and they performed mostly for the emperors' personal pleasure. To this day operatic professionals are still referred to as "Disciples of the Pear Garden" (梨园弟子 / 梨園弟子, líyuán dìzi).

Song to Qing
By the Song Dynasty, Canjun Opera had become a performance that involved singing and dancing, and led to the development of Zaju (雜劇).  Forms such as the Zaju and Nanxi (南戏) further matured in the Song dynasty (960–1279) and Yuan dynasty (1279–1368).  Acts based on rhyming schemes and innovations such as specialized roles like Dan (旦, dàn, female), Sheng (生, shēng, male), Hua (花, huā, painted-face) and Chou (丑, chŏu, clown) were introduced into the opera. Although actors in theatrical performances of the Song Dynasty strictly adhered to speaking in Classical Chinese onstage, during the Yuan Dynasty actors speaking or performing lyrics in the vernacular tongue became popular on stage.

In the Yuan poetic drama, only one person sang for all of the four acts, but in the poetic dramas that developed from Nanxi during the Ming dynasty (1368–1644), all the characters were able to sing and perform.  A playwright Gao Ming late in the Yuan dynasty wrote an opera called Tale of the Pipa which became highly popular, and became a model for Ming dynasty drama as it was the favorite opera of the first Ming emperor Zhu Yuanzhang. The presentation at this point resembled the Chinese opera of today, except that the librettos were then very long. The operatic artists were required to be skilled in many fields; according to Recollections of Tao An (陶庵夢憶) by Zhang Dai, performers had to learn how to play various musical instruments, singing and dancing before they were taught acting.

The dominant form of the Ming and early Qing dynasties was Kunqu, which originated in the Wu cultural area. A famous work in Kunqu is The Peony Pavilion by Tang Xianzu.  Kunqu later evolved into a longer form of play called chuanqi, which became one of the five melodies that made up Sichuan opera. Currently Chinese operas continue to exist in 368 different forms, the best known being Beijing opera, which assumed its present form in the mid-19th century and was extremely popular in the latter part of the Qing dynasty (1644–1911).
 	

In Beijing opera, traditional Chinese string and percussion instruments provide a strong rhythmic accompaniment to the acting. The acting is based on allusion: gestures, footwork, and other body movements express such actions as riding a horse, rowing a boat, or opening a door. Spoken dialogue is divided into recitative and Beijing colloquial speech, the former employed by serious characters and the latter by young females and clowns. Character roles are strictly defined, and each character have their own elaborate make-up design. The traditional repertoire of Beijing opera includes more than 1,000 works, mostly taken from historical novels about political and military struggles.

1912–1949
At the turn of the 20th century, Chinese students returning from abroad began to experiment with Western plays. Following the May Fourth Movement of 1919, a number of Western plays were staged in China, and Chinese playwrights began to imitate this form. The most notable of the new-style playwrights was Cao Yu (b. 1910). His major works—Thunderstorm, Sunrise, Wilderness, and Peking Man—written between 1934 and 1940, have been widely read in China.

The Republican Era saw the rise of Yue opera and all female Yue Opera troupes in Shanghai and Zhejiang. A woman-centric form, with all female casts and majority female audience members, plots were often love stories. Its rise was related to the changing place of women in society.   

In the 1930s, theatrical productions performed by traveling Red Army cultural troupes in Communist-controlled areas were consciously used to promote party goals and political philosophy. By the 1940s, theater was well established in the Communist-controlled areas.

1949–1985

In the early years of the People's Republic of China, development of Peking opera was encouraged; many new operas on historical and modern themes were written, and earlier operas continued to be performed. As a popular art form, opera has usually been the first of the arts to reflect changes in Chinese policy. In the mid-1950s, for example, it was the first to benefit under the Hundred Flowers Campaign, such as the birth of Jilin opera.

In 1954 there were approximately 2000 government-sponsored opera troupes working throughout China each consisting of 50-100 professional performers. Despite its popularity, Peking opera made up a small percentage of these troupes. After the Chinese Communist Revolution a new genre emerged known as Schinggo opera which encompassed the revolutionary energy of the current sociopolitical climate. This operatic style built its foundation from the folk traditions of the rural community while also becoming influenced by European music.

Opera may be used as commentaries on political affairs, and in November 1965, the attack on Beijing deputy mayor Wu Han and his historical play Hai Rui Dismissed from Office as anti-Mao, signaled the beginning of the Cultural Revolution. During the Cultural Revolution, most opera troupes were disbanded, performers and scriptwriters were persecuted, and all operas were banned except the eight "model operas" that had been sanctioned by Jiang Qing and her associates. Western-style plays were condemned as "dead drama" and "poisonous weeds", and were not performed. After the fall of the Gang of Four in 1976, Beijing Opera enjoyed a revival and continued to be a very popular form of entertainment, both on stage and television.

Present
In the 21st century, Chinese opera is seldom publicly staged except in formal Chinese opera houses. It may also be presented during the lunar seventh month Chinese Ghost Festival in Asia as a form of entertainment to the spirits and audience. More than thirty famous pieces of Kunqu opera continue to be performed today, including The Peony Pavilion, The Peach Blossom Fan, and adaptions of Journey to the West, Romance of the Three Kingdoms.

In 2001, Kunqu was recognized as Masterpiece of Oral and Intangible Heritage of Humanity by United Nations Educational, Cultural and Scientific Organization (UNESCO)

Costumes and make-ups 

Face paint plays a significant role in portraying the internal complexities of the performer's character with hundreds of combinations of colours and patterns. Below are some general meanings which may be further focused on extremely specific details depending on the facial location of the colour.

 Red - bravery, fidelity, loyalty, chaste
 Black - impatient, straightforward, vulgar, rude
 White - cunning, treachery, villainous, traitorous
 Blue - ferocity, courage, uncontrollable, cruel, violent
 Yellow - clever, secretive, mysterious, evil
 Purple - loyalty, filial piety, age
 Green - evil spirits, brave, purposeful
 Gold and silver - gods, supernatural (monsters, spirits, demons)

Musical Characteristics
The musical components of Chinese opera are created as an inseparable entity from voice and dance/movement. Both the musicians and the actors contribute to composing musical accompaniment. This collaborative process is reflected within the production by the immaculate synchronicity between the actors' movements and the sounds of the orchestra. The musicians are required to flawlessly support the actors with sound, often waiting for vocal cues or physical signals such as the stomp of a foot. Traditionally, musicians often performed from memory - a feat made even more impressive considering pieces or sections of compositions were subject to infinite variations and often repeated.

The orchestra utilized a pentatonic scale until a 7-note scale was introduced by Mongolia during the Yuan Dynasty. The two extra notes functioned similarly to accidentals within western notation.

Instruments 
The instruments in the orchestra were divided into two categories:

 wen - string and wind instruments: characterized as clear, soft, or gentle and typically used during vocal pieces.
 wu - percussive instruments: led dancing and movement, kettle drum "conducts" the whole orchestra, gongs signal audience to sit, appearance of female lead, anger, and fighting.

String Instruments
Traditional Chinese string instruments used in Chinese Opera include:
Gaohu
Erhu
Pipa
Sanxian
Yangqin
Yueqin
Jinghu
Jing erhu
Banhu
Erxian

Percussion Instruments
Traditional Chinese percussion instruments used in Chinese Opera include:
Paiban
Bo
Bangu
Daluo
Xiaoluo

Woodwind Instruments
Traditional Chinese woodwind instruments used in Chinese Opera include:
Dizi
Suona
Sheng
Guan

Regional genres

Gallery

In popular culture
An update in January 2022 for the game Genshin Impact includes a story quest that features a musical number from the character Yun Jin that is in the style of Chinese opera, which went viral as it was the first time many people around the world have heard Chinese opera. Even Yang Yang, the Chinese voice of Yun Jin, was surprised about it.

See also
Chinese culture
Chinese art
C-pop
Chinese drama
 Music of China
 Pear Garden
 Qu (poetry)
 Yuan poetry
 Zaju
 Revolutionary opera
 Chinese contemporary classical opera

Notes

References
 Rossabi, Morris (1988). Khubilai Khan: His Life and Times. Berkeley: University of California Press. .

Further reading

 Shih, Chung-wen (1976). The Golden Age of Chinese Drama: Yüan Tsa-chu. Princeton, NJ: Princeton University Press. .
 Riley, Jo (1997). Chinese Theatre and the Actor in Performance. Cambridge, UK: Cambridge University Press. .

External links
 "Traveling with the Jinju", a Deutsche Welle documentary depicting a 21st-century touring Jinju (晋剧) Shanxi Opera troupe